Thagapansamy is a 2006 Indian Tamil-language action film directed by Shivashanmughan and produced by Tiruchi Gopalji. The film stars Prashanth and Pooja, while Namitha, Karunas and Vincent Asokan played other supporting roles. Featuring music composed by Srikanth Deva, the film had a delayed release on 28 December 2006 after going through production problems. The film is best remembered for being the acting debut of Pa. Ranjith whose cameo as a Marwadi received wide acclaim

Plot
The film begins with Kathirvel (Prashanth), a do-gooder going all out to get water for his village. With monsoon repeatedly failing, his village reels under drought, and he runs from pillar to post to get a well dug in the village. He manages to bring Shanmugham (Mahadevan), a water-divining expert, to dig a well. Shanmugham, his wife, and daughter Marikozhundhu (Pooja) come to the village. Unfortunately, a freak mishap kills Shanmugham, and the villagers' search for water continues. To eke out their livelihood, all the villagers, led by Kadhirvel, decide to leave the village with a heavy heart to take up employment in a farmhouse in Rajasthan. Upon reaching the place, they come to know they have been taken as bonded laborers, and there is no way out but to work there tirelessly for the next three years. They undergo physical and mental torture from the greedy landlord Thakur Dass (Vincent Asokan) aided by his Marwadi sidekick (Pa. Ranjith). A silver lining in the cloud is Swapna (Namitha), Thakur's sister. She gets fascinated by Kadhirvel's heroics. The rest is how Kadhirvel fights for his men, helps them reach their village back without any danger and eventually marries Marikozhundhu.

Cast
Prashanth as Kathirvel
Pa. Ranjith as Commentator
Pooja as Marikozhundhu
Namitha as Swapna
Vincent Asokan as Thakur Dass
Mahadevan as Shanmugam
Karunas
Thambi Ramaiah
Besant Ravi

Production
The film was launched in July 2005 by Amudha Durairaj and her production house Deivanai Movies, who had previously made Thamizh (2002) with Prashanth in the lead role. The cast and crew were announced at the launch, though the film soon after went through a change of producer with Tiruchi Gopalji taking over. Meera Jasmine had initially been signed by the production house to play the lead female role but backed out and Pooja was subsequently handed the role. Director Pa. Ranjith worked as an assistant director in this movie. Prashanth worked for the film in 2005 simultaneously with several other projects, including ventures such as Venkatesh's Petrol and Ramesh Selvan's Runway, both of which were subsequently shelved. By October 2005, it was reported that most of the film's shoot was over and that the team had shot scenes across Tiruchi, Karaikudi, Gingee, Thenkasi and Rajasthan. Cinematographer Sridhar was injured in March 2006 at the shoot of the film, when he fell off a horse he had been sitting on. One of the songs was shot at Gingee Fort with 80 dancers, 10 elephants and 20 horses.

A website run by Indiaglitz.com was launched for the film in April 2006, coinciding with Prashanth's 33rd birthday. The team then screened the completed film to then Chief Minister of Tamil Nadu, M. Karunanidhi, at a special show at Four Frames Studios in June 2006.

Release
The film was scheduled to release after much delay on 22 December 2006 but was delayed by a day after actors Prashanth and Karunas held up the lab processing due to non-payment of their acting fees. The producer of the movie, Tiruchi Gopalji was strapped for cash and could not pay the actors. After approaching producers’ council of Tamil Nadu for help, the issue was sorted out and the Chennai distribution rights of the movie were given to Karunas. The film subsequently ran in smaller theatres and then was re-released on 28 December to larger screens, though was only able to have a below average run at the box office.

The film opened to mixed reviews, with a critic from Sify.com noting that the film was "average" and claimed "the film starts on a promising note but the second half peters out into a mass masala. The decent first half has a good message and looks realistic but slowly down the lane the story loses track.". Another critic gave the film a "good" verdict, revealing "directors who make their debut always attempt to prove themselves in their very first movie itself so as to stay in the hearts of the audience, and the director of this movie too has tried out something new." A further reviewer noted "while the first half is realistic and absorbing, the second half is so cinematic, outdated and silly that it completely negates the good things about the first half and then some."

Soundtrack

The film score and the soundtrack were composed by Srikanth Deva, with eleven songs produced for the album and lyrics written by Shiva Shanmugam. The soundtrack released on 15 December 2005, more than a year before the film had a theatrical release.

References

External links 
 

2006 films
2000s Tamil-language films
Films scored by Vidyasagar
Indian action films
2006 action films